Peter Ahrweiler (6 January 1915 – 3 September 2004) was a German actor and theater director.

Biography

Early life 
Ahrweiler was born in Krefeld.

Career 
Ahrweiler had always wanted to be a pilot. However, after World War II, he opted to begin his career as a cabaret artist. He took over the management of a small theater called Kleine Komödie, located in Hamburg in 1953. He appeared as an actor in several films, including Der Hauptmann von Köpenick in 1956 with Heinz Rühmann, Drei Birken auf der Heide in 1956, and Panic Time in 1980. He also appeared in a 1996 episode of Adelheid und ihre Mörder.

Death 
Ahrweiler died on 3 September 2004 in Hamburg after a long illness. His resting place is at the Ohlsdorf Cemetery in Hamburg.

Filmography

References

External links 

1915 births
2004 deaths
German male actors
Burials at the Ohlsdorf Cemetery